LaGrange is a historic plantation house located near Harris Crossroads, Vance County, North Carolina.  It was built about 1830, and is a two-story, Greek Revival style frame dwelling with Italianate style decorative elements.  It has a later one-story rear ell.  It features a one-story full width front porch with a bracketed cornice and square fluted columns.  Also on the property are three contributing outbuildings and a family cemetery.

It was added to the National Register of Historic Places in 1982.

References

Plantation houses in North Carolina
Houses on the National Register of Historic Places in North Carolina
Italianate architecture in North Carolina
Greek Revival houses in North Carolina
Houses completed in 1830
Houses in Vance County, North Carolina
National Register of Historic Places in Vance County, North Carolina
1830 establishments in North Carolina